The City Vista Recreation Reserve is a soccer stadium in Plumpton, Melbourne, Australia. It has been the home stadium of Caroline Springs George Cross Football Club since its opening in 2019 and recently the temporary base of Western United (A-League Women). It has a current seated capacity of 3,000.

History

The venue was opened in mid-2019 for $13,000,000 as an improvement of local capacity at a higher level of the club of Caroline Springs George Cross and to encourage local residents for participation and action of sports/recreational activites at the venue. Western United used the venue as their training grounds for the their first two seasons of existence and played their first match against tenants Caroline Springs George Cross infront of 3,247 spectators on 22 August 2019. The A-League Women's side of Western United announced they would use the venue for training and home matches as well on 16 September 2022.

Structure and facilities
The stadium features two synthetic fields and an extra grass field; the main field accommodating 3,000 spectators which includes a grandstand of seats and an extra grass field.

Records
The highest attendance recorded at the City Vista is 2,753, for Western United (A-League Women)'s first A-League Women fixture against Melbourne Victory on 19 November 2022. The lowest attendance recorded is 630 for an A-League Women match between Western United and Wellington Phoenix on 7 January 2023.

References

Soccer venues in Melbourne
Sports venues in Melbourne
Sport in the City of Melton